James W. Byng is a British botanist who is Managing Director and Scientific Curator at Hortus Botanicus Delft (TU Delft Botanic Garden), an  associate of Plant Gateway, and a Visiting Research Fellow at Naturalis Biodiversity Center. He was trained at the University of Aberdeen, Royal Botanic Gardens Edinburgh and Royal Botanic Gardens, Kew.

He is an authority on the Myrtaceae genus Syzygium Gaertn. and is working on a global monograph for the group with regional collaborators. He is also a co-author on the latest Angiosperm Phylogeny Group plant classification, APG IV, and author of the comprehensive practical plant books The Flowering Plants Handbook and The Gymnosperms Handbook

References

Year of birth missing (living people)
Living people
British botanists
Alumni of the University of Aberdeen